HD 207129 is a G-type pre-main-sequence star in the constellation of Grus. It has an apparent visual magnitude of approximately 5.58. This is a Sun-like star with the same stellar classification G2V and a similar mass. It is roughly the same age as the Sun, but has a lower abundance of elements other than hydrogen and helium; what astronomers term the star's metallicity.

A debris disk has been imaged around this star in visible light using the ACS instrument on the Hubble Space Telescope; it has also been imaged in the infrared (70 μm) using the MIPS instrument on the Spitzer Space Telescope.  Based on the ACS image, the disk appears to have a radius of about 163 astronomical units and to be about 30 AU wide, and to be inclined at 60° to the plane of the sky.

Another star, CCDM J21483-4718B (also designated CD−47 13929 or WDS J21483-4718B), of apparent visual magnitude 8.7, has been observed 55 arcseconds away from this star, but based on comparison of proper motions, it is believed to be an optical double and not physically related to its companion.

References

Grus (constellation)
G-type main-sequence stars
Pre-main-sequence stars
Double stars
207129
0838
107649
8323
Durchmusterung objects